is a Japanese light novel series written by Kōji Natsumi and illustrated by Asagi Tōsaka. A manga adaptation by Takahiro Seguchi launched in Monthly Shōnen Ace in October 2018, and an anime television series adaptation by Satelight aired from January to March 2019.

Plot
A young Chinese-Japanese teenager named Kei Narutani and his Chinese friend Minghua, both living in Shanghai, are forced to evacuate to Japan when the city is attacked by the Xi. During their escape by sea, several Xi fighters begin sinking the evacuation fleet when Kei suddenly witnesses the Xi being repelled by a strange fighter plane. When the plane subsequently crashes, Kei rushes to aid the pilot, but is surprised to find a pretty girl at the controls.

After arriving in Japan, Kei begins investigating the origins of the strange plane, and before long he is captured by Japanese secret service agents. He learns from them that it was a Swedish fighter retrofitted with special technology developed by the JASDF. In order to combat the Xi, their technology—HiMAT (Highly Maneuverable Aircraft Technology) and EPCM (Electronic Perceptory Counter-Measures)—was reverse-engineered and applied to existing fighter models, codenamed "Daughters"; in order to function properly, the Daughters require autonomous interface units called "Anima", cyborg girls who are grown around salvaged Xi parts. The girl Kei encountered, named Gripen (after the plane she flies), is one such Anima unit who formed an emotional attachment to him when he came to her aid. When her supervising developer notices that effect, he invites Kei into the Anima project and act as Gripen's partner in order to boost her flight performance and prevent her from being scrapped.

Characters

A Chinese-Japanese teenager who was living in Shanghai before evacuating from a Xi attack. After witnessing Gripen fighting a pair of Xi fighters and then crashing into the sea, he impulsively comes to her aid, which creates an emotional bond between them. With his mother, an air show pilot, killed in a Xi ambush attack, he decides to join the Japan Air Self-Defense Force to take revenge on them. After becoming privy to the Anima project, he becomes Gripen's weapon systems officer and emotional anchor.

A pink-haired Anima flying a Swedish JAS 39F Gripen produced by Saab. She suffers from an inherent emotional defect which leaves her scatterbrained and lacking a sense of purpose. When they first meet, Gripen forms an emotional dependency on Kei, which is noted by her supervisor, and thus Kei is taken into the program to provide her with a motivation for fighting the Xi. Her call sign is "Barbie 01". "Gripen" translates to "griffin" in English.

A blonde Anima who flies an F-15J Eagle, developed by Mitsubishi Heavy Industries. She has a perky and capricious personality and is also a very talented combat pilot. Immediately upon meeting Kei, she takes a close personal interest in him. She also adores Yashirodōri as a father. Her call sign is "Barbie 02".

An Anima with the call sign "Barbie 03", who arrives at Komatsu separately from Gripen and Eagle. She flies an F-4 Phantom II and is the first Anima created by the JSDF. Although trained for combat, her specialty is tactical reconnaissance; because of this, she is also able to interface with Anima information channels to obtain or manipulate information. Because of her status as the first ever Anima, and the self-reliance forced upon her when it was assumed that no other Anima would be created, she is very condescending to her counterparts, causing friction within the team. After Kei saves her from a tight spot shortly after her arrival, she becomes quite fond of him. As a hobby, she dyes her hair, mostly in shades of green.

Another Anima produced by Mitsubishi Heavy Industries, her designated call sign is "Barbie 04". She flies a Mitsubishi F-2. She does not speak, and her actual appearance is unknown, as anyone seeing her beholds an image of the person they are currently thinking about the most; this effect occurs due to the instability of her central core, which acts as an empathic reflector. Additionally, she likes to dress up in lolita clothing.

The only American Anima produced by Boeing Defense, Space & Security, flying a Boeing F/A-18E/F Super Hornet. Her call sign is "Sapphire 01". Her will and consciousness are taken over by the Xi when she is lured into a Xi trap along with Kei and Gripen, and she becomes the first Anima to be corrupted and destroyed. Her name is a reference to a common nickname for the Super Hornet.

Kei's Chinese childhood friend with a forceful attitude, who lost her parents during the chaotic evacuation of Shanghai. She has formed a crush on Kei and considers herself his girlfriend, but since she never told him about her feelings, he just views her as an older sister.

The leading JASDF scientist behind the reverse-engineering of the Xi's weaponry, and the developer of the Anima system. Because of the emotional effect Kei has on Gripen, he constantly nicknames him . Despite his gruff demeanor, he cares for his creations like a father.

An American scientist responsible for Rhino whose specialty is artificial intelligence; he is developing drone fighters based on Anima flight and combat data.

A JASDF engineer working under Yashirodōri.

Media

Light novels
Kōji Natsumi published the first light novel, with illustrations by Asagi Tōsaka, under ASCII Media Works' Dengeki Bunko imprint in 2014.

Manga
A manga adaptation with art by Takahiro Seguchi began serialization in Kadokawa Shoten's shōnen manga magazine Monthly Shōnen Ace magazine on October 26, 2018.

Anime
An anime television series adaptation by Satelight was announced on June 1, 2018. The series is directed by Katsumi Ono and written by Shingo Nagai, with character designs by Tōru Imanishi. I've Sound composed the series' music. The series aired from January 10 to March 28, 2019 on AT-X, before airing on Tokyo MX, BS11, Sun TV, and AbemaTV, and ran for 12 episodes. Run Girls, Run! performs the series' opening theme song, "Break the Blue!!". The ending theme song is "Colorful Wing", performed by Yūka Morishima, Hitomi Ōwada, and Shiori Izawa. Crunchyroll simulcast the series worldwide, excluding in Asia. Discotek Media licensed the series and released it on home video in December 2021.

References

External links
  
  
 

2019 anime television series debuts
2014 Japanese novels
Anime and manga based on light novels
Crunchyroll anime
Dengeki Bunko
Discotek Media
Kadokawa Dwango franchises
Kadokawa Shoten manga
Light novels
Military anime and manga
Science fiction anime and manga
Satelight
Shōnen manga
Aviation comics